The Panay forest frog (Platymantis panayensis) is a species of frog in the family Ceratobatrachidae.
It is endemic to western Panay, Philippines.

Its natural habitats are subtropical or tropical moist lowland forest and subtropical or tropical moist montane forest.
It is threatened by habitat loss.

References

Platymantis
Amphibians of the Philippines
Endemic fauna of the Philippines
Fauna of Panay
Taxonomy articles created by Polbot
Amphibians described in 1996